Petar Kovačević (born 30 October 2002) is a Serbian professional basketball player for Mega Basket of the ABA League and the Basketball League of Serbia.

Early life and career 
Kovačević grew up with the Mega Basket youth system. He was a member of the Mega U19 team that won the Junior ABA League for the 2020–21 season, recording 19 points, 7.7 rebounds, and three assists per game. Also, he won the Junior ABA League Ideal Starting Five selection.

Professional career 
Kovačević played for OKK Beograd for two Basketball League of Serbia (BLS) seasons, 2020–21 and 2021–22. Over 29 games in the 2021–22 season, he averaged 18.2 points, 8.2 rebounds, and 2.4 assists per game. Kovačević joined Mega Basket for the 2022 Serbian SuperLeague Playoffs.

National team career 
In July 2021, Kovačević was a member of the Serbia U19 national team at the FIBA Under-19 Basketball World Cup in Latvia. Over seven tournament games, he averaged 3.7 points, 1.9 rebounds, and 0.4 assists per game. In July 2022, Kovačević was a member of the Serbian under-20 team that won a gold medal at the 2022 FIBA U20 European Championship Division B in Tbilisi, Georgia. Over seven tournament games, he averaged 11.1 points, 1.9 rebounds, and 1.1 assists per game.

References

External links 
 Petar Kovacevic at realgm.com
 Petar Kovacevic at proballers.com
 Petar Kovacevic at eurobasket.com
 Petar Kovacevic at aba-liga.com

2002 births
Living people
ABA League players
Basketball League of Serbia players
KK Mega Basket players
OKK Beograd players
Montenegrin expatriate basketball people in Serbia
Serbian men's basketball players
Serbs of Montenegro
Sportspeople from Podgorica